The Scout is a 1994 American comedy film starring Brendan Fraser and Albert Brooks and directed by Michael Ritchie.

Plot
After the New York Yankees' latest prospect suffers a humiliating bout of stage fright in his debut for the team, scout Al Percolo, who discovered the young man, is punished by being sent to the Mexican countryside to look for his next find.

Al's efforts are fruitless until he encounters Steve Nebraska, a young American with a consistent 100+ MPH fastball and a perfect batting average.  The childlike Steve immediately agrees to join the Yankees when Al asks him, but when Al calls the team's general manager to report his find, he is fired and told not to return. Al defies the order and brings Steve back to the States anyway.  The first indication that all may not be right with Steve occurs when he panics at Newark International Airport when he and Al are momentarily separated. Later, at Al's apartment, Steve thrashes in his sleep, screaming at an unseen assailant.

Al arranges an open audition at Yankee Stadium in front of representatives from every Major League Baseball team. After Steve strikes out Keith Hernández and homers off Bret Saberhagen, a bidding war breaks out. The Yankees win the bid war, signing Steve to a $55 million contract, but after Steve violently snaps at press photographers, team management demands that he be psychiatrically evaluated and cleared before he plays his first game.

Al picks the first listed psychiatrist in the phone book, a Doctor H. Aaron, and hopes that the evaluation will be swift, so that he and Steve can get on with life.  After examining Steve, however, Dr. Aaron finds him to be deeply troubled and so severely abused as a child that he has blocked almost every memory of his early life. Desperate for Steve to play so that both can get paid, Al begs Dr. Aaron to clear Steve for play, on the condition that she sees Steve everyday before making his MLB debut.

Life with Steve proves difficult for Al; Steve throws plates at reporters outside the apartment, upstages Tony Bennett at his own show, and argues with Al over what he does with his free time.  At a press conference, Al lies about Steve's past.  Dr. Aaron is livid when she finds out, but Al points out that Steve's behavior stems from her helping him acknowledge and deal with his past. Al pleads with Dr. Aaron to continue the good work she is doing for Steve.  When the Yankees reach the World Series, however, Steve is suddenly depressed.  Worse yet, he is contractually obligated to pitch in Game 1.

A sold-out Yankee Stadium waits for Steve's debut in Game 1 of the World Series.  When Steve is spotted on the roof of the stadium, Al sends for a helicopter to fetch him, then climbs up to plead with him to come down.  Steve adamantly refuses, and Al, risking his own career, tells Steve that he can walk away from it all, no strings attached.  Touched by Al's selflessness, Steve relents.  His spirits greatly lifted, he boards the copter to make his grand entrance.

Steve pitches a perfect game, striking out 27 St. Louis Cardinals batters on 81 consecutive strikes, and hits two solo home runs in a 2-0 Yankees victory.  As Steve acknowledges Al as the Yankees celebrate his efforts, Al smiles proudly.

Cast
 Albert Brooks as Al Percolo
 Brendan Fraser as Steve Nebraska
 Dianne Wiest as Doctor H. Aaron
 Anne Twomey as Jennifer
 Lane Smith as Ron Wilson
 Michael Rapaport as Tommy Lacy
 Barry Shabaka Henley as McDermott
 J. K. Simmons as Assistant Coach 
 John Capodice as Caruso
Art Garfield as Stan

Production
The film was based on a Roger Angell article which had been optioned by Andrew Bergman's producing partner. Bergman wrote his script for Peter Falk to play the scout and Jim Belushi to play the player. "There were honestly five different versions of this movie," says Bergman. "The original version was, he found this guy in Mexico who’s the second white man ever to receive these injections, the first being Babe Ruth. And it was this political guy on the run. It was a completely different kind of movie."

Falk was not available then Walter Matthau was going to make it with Michael Ritchie. The project did not proceed until years later with Ritchie directing and Albert Brooks playing the scout. "That wasn’t my conception at all," said Bergman. "The original conception was much more bananas. The Scout still has glimmers of the original, but not doing the original is high up on my very large list of regrets, because Peter was born to play that guy. He’s so obtuse and that tunnel-vision thing he had was just great.”

In a July 1999 interview with Gavin Smith in Film Comment, Brooks said that The Scout was originally intended for Rodney Dangerfield. "It was lying around, never going to get made, and I said I would like to do that."

Brooks said that he contributed to a rewrite of the script because "it was written very silly." The version he worked on, he said, "did not end like 'Rocky' with that bullshit big ending." But according to Brooks, the studio forced Ritchie to change the ending.

Cameos
Bob Costas, Tim McCarver, Tony Bennett, John Sterling, Keith Hernández, Bret Saberhagen, George Steinbrenner, Brian Cashman, Ozzie Smith, Bob Tewksbury and Bobby Murcer, among others, play themselves in the film.

Reception
The Scout was a box-office flop and the reviews were predominantly negative, with TV Guide stating, "'The Scout' feels like a classic case of too many cooks spoiling the broth." Variety also negatively reviewed the film, saying that Brooks and Ritchie "never quite commit to either of the movie's disparate chords -- bailing out of the batter's box in terms of the psychological drama and, after some amusing moments at the outset, generally steering clear of broad comedy." Time magazine's Richard Schickel praised the film, writing, "The Scout is the best comedy-fantasy about baseball ever made, which goes to show that if Hollywood keeps trying, eventually someone will get it right." The film holds a 28% rating on Rotten Tomatoes based on 25 reviews.

References

External links

 
 

1994 films
1990s sports comedy films
American baseball films
American sports comedy films
Films scored by Bill Conti
Films directed by Michael Ritchie
Films set in New York City
Films with screenplays by Albert Brooks
Films with screenplays by Monica Johnson
20th Century Fox films
1994 comedy films
Films with screenplays by Andrew Bergman
1990s English-language films
1990s American films
Films about Major League Baseball